TouchStone Software Corporation, Inc., founded in 1982, is an American software developer for the personal computer (PC) industry, specializing in system update technology. It also owns and operates a network of Internet Web properties. Based in Marco Island, Florida, the company was a subsidiary of Phoenix Technologies until 2010.

The company's portfolio of Internet properties serve as the main outlet to deliver its software products, such as RegistryWizard, DriverAgent and BIOS Agent.

Products
 PC Works / Unihost / Macline - communications programs that allow computers to link with IBM PC's using modems
 Checklt & WinChecklt - Diagnostic Kit
 PC-cillin - Antivirus
 e.support
 e.checkit
UndeletePlus
Registry Wizard
Software Updater
NTFS Undelete

Mergers and acquisitions

62nds
On May 9, 2007, the company acquired 62nds Solutions Ltd.

PCDrivers
In May 2007, it acquired PCDrivers.com, an original device driver resource website. The acquisition includes the PCDrivers.com domain name and PCDrivers.com's device driver library. On July 9, 2007, the company acquired DriversPlanet.com.

The acquisition includes the domain name and DriversPlanet.com's device driver library. DriversPlanet.com is a device driver resource website on the Internet.

Drivermagic and hijackpro
On June 6, 2007, the company acquired Doncaster (England) based companies: hijackpro and DriverMagic and their related assets from e2sms designer and entrepreneur Glenn Bluff.

Unicore Software
On May 1998, the company acquired Massachusetts based company.

References

External links
 

Software companies based in Massachusetts
Software companies of the United States